Australian duo the Veronicas, whose members are twin sisters Jessica Origliasso and Lisa Origliasso, have recorded songs for three studio albums. Having signed with Engine Room Recordings at the age of 19, the Origliasso twins received funding to write and record demos for other artists with different songwriters around the world. By the age of 20, the duo signed with Sire Records in the United States and began working on their debut studio album  The Secret Life Of.... The lead single "4ever" was co-written by Dr. Luke and Max Martin who also co-wrote the second single "Everything I'm Not" with the Origliasso twins and Rami Yacoub. The former song reached number two on the Australian ARIA Charts, while the latter peaked at number seven. The duo collaborated with Josh Alexander and Billy Steinberg on "When It All Falls Apart" and "Leave Me Alone", both third and fifth singles from the album, respectively. "Revolution", the fourth single from The Secret Life Of... was written by Raine Maida and Chantal Kreviazuk. Preceding the release of the album, the Origliasso's co-wrote the songs "All About Us", "Faded" and "What's Going On" which were later recorded by t.A.T.u., Kate DeAraugo and Casey Donovan, respectively.

In 2007, the Veronicas released their second album Hook Me Up on 3 November 2007. Most of the album was co-written by the Origliasso sisters along with Toby Gad. Together they wrote "Take Me on the Floor", "Untouched" and "Popular", the latter of which features co-writing credits from Beni Barca. The duo also share writing credits with Greg Wells and Shelly Peiken for the album's lead single "Hook Me Up", which became their first number-one hit. The song "This Love" was written for the duo by Gad and Kesha (credited under her full name Kesha Sebert).

Following extensive touring to promote Hook Me Up, which concluded in December 2009, the Veronicas took a short hiatus before commencing work on their third album in 2010. Two years later, the duo released "Lolita" as the lead single for their third album which was then titled Life on Mars. The song was co-written by the twins, along with Gad and LP (credited as Laura Pergolizzi). The album's release date was being pushed back constantly by their label Warner Bros. Records (the parent company or Sire Records) which led to the Veronicas leaving the label. By 2014, the duo signed a new deal with Sony Music and the third album was retitled The Veronicas. The record features the singles "You Ruin Me" and "If You Love Someone", both co-written by the Origliasso's and DNA Songs, with the former track becoming their second Australian number-one hit. The Veronicas went onto release a series of singles between 2016 and 2021 (In My Blood, On Your Side, Think Of Me, Biting My Tongue, The Only High) when eventually came to an album two album conclusion called: Godzilla and Human

Songs

See also
The Veronicas discography

Notes

References

The Veronicas
 
Veronicas, The